A password is a word, phrase or string of characters used to gain access to a resource, such as an object, area or information.

Password may also refer to:

Film
 Password (2019 Bengali film), an Indian film
 Password (2019 Bangladeshi film)
 Password (2019 Nepali film)

Music
Passwords (band), a Canadian rock band
Password (record producer), Nigerian record producer
Passwords (album), a 2018 album by American folk rock band Dawes
Password, a 2000 album by Geoff Muldaur
"Password", a song by DRAM from his 2016 album Big Baby DRAM
"Password", a song by Kylie Minogue from her 2001 CD single Your Disco Needs You
"Password", a 1964 song by Kitty Wells

Television
Password (British game show), a British panel game show based on the US version, 1963–1983
Password (American  game show), an American television game show
Password, a home version of the television game show Password

Other uses
Password (video gaming), a video game saving method
Passwords (2000), a book by French philosopher Jean Baudrillard, published in French as Mots de passe
European Strategic Program on Research in Information Technology (ESPRIT), a project researching X.509 technology, called Password

See also
Password manager, software or hardware used to generate complex computer passwords